Syneches simplex is a species of hybotid dance fly in the family Hybotidae.

References

External links

 

Hybotidae
Articles created by Qbugbot
Insects described in 1852